Frequent-flyer programs (or Frequent-flyer programmes) are customer loyalty programs used by many passenger airlines. This is a list of current airlines with frequent-flyer programs, and the names of those programs.

North America

Air Canada – Aeroplan
Air Canada Express – Aeroplan
Air Canada Rouge – Aeroplan
Air Creebec – Aeroplan
Air Inuit – Isaruuk Rewards
Bearskin Airlines – Aeroplan
Calm Air – Aeroplan
Canadian North – Aurora Rewards
First Air – Aeroplan
Porter Airlines – VIPorter
WestJet – WestJet Rewards
WestJet Encore – WestJet Rewards
WestJet Link – WestJet Rewards

Aeromar – Mileage Plus
Aeroméxico – Club Premier
Aeroméxico Connect – Club Premier

Alaska Airlines – Mileage Plan 
American Airlines – AAdvantage
American Airlines Shuttle – AAdvantage
American Eagle – AAdvantage
Cape Air – AAdvantage / Mileage Plan / MileagePlus / SkyMiles
Delta Air Lines – SkyMiles
Delta Connection – SkyMiles
Delta Shuttle – SkyMiles
Frontier Airlines – FRONTIER Miles
Hawaiian Airlines – HawaiianMiles
Island Air – Island Miles
JetBlue – TrueBlue
Ravn Alaska – FlyAway Rewards
Silver Airways – MileagePlus / TrueBlue
Southwest Airlines – Rapid Rewards
Spirit Airlines – Free Spirit
Sun Country Airlines – Sun Country Rewards
United Airlines – MileagePlus
United Express – MileagePlus

Central America & Caribbean Region

BahamasAir – BahamasAir Flyer

Cayman Airways – Sir Turtle Rewards

Avianca Costa Rica – LifeMiles
Sansa Airlines – LifeMiles

Avianca El Salvador – LifeMiles (previously Distancia)

Air Caraïbes – Préférence

Avianca Guatemala – LifeMiles

Avianca Honduras – LifeMiles

Copa Airlines – ConnectMiles

Seaborne Airlines – Airmiles

Caribbean Airlines – Caribbean Miles

South America

Aerolíneas Argentinas – Aerolíneas Plus

Azul Brazilian Airlines – TudoAzul
LATAM Brasil – LATAM Pass
Gol Transportes Aéreos – Smiles

LATAM Chile – LATAM Pass
LATAM Express – LATAM Pass

Avianca – LifeMiles
Copa Airlines Colombia – ConnectMiles
LATAM Colombia – LATAM Pass

Avianca Ecuador – LifeMiles
LATAM Ecuador – LATAM Pass

LATAM Paraguay – LATAM Pass

LATAM Perú – LATAM Pass

Suriname Airways – Loyal Wings

Aeropostal – AeroPass
Avior Airlines – Avior Plus
Conviasa – Infinito

Europe

Fly Arna – AirRewards

Austrian Airlines – Miles & More

Belavia – Leader

Brussels Airlines – Miles & More (previously Brussels Privilege and LOOPs)

Bulgaria Air – Fly More

Croatia Airlines – Miles & More (previously FF Club)

Czech Airlines – OK Plus

Scandinavian Airlines – EuroBonus
Sun Air – Executive Club

Nordica Airlines – Miles & More

Atlantic Airways – Súlubonus

Finnair – Finnair Plus

Air Corsica – Flying Blue
Air France – Flying Blue
Air France Hop – Flying Blue
Chalair Aviation – Flying Blue
Corsair – Club Corsair
Twin Jet – Flying Blue
Wijet – Flying Blue

Condor – Mileage Plan (affiliate; previously Miles & More)
Eurowings – Miles & More
Lufthansa – Miles & More
Lufthansa CityLine – Miles & More
Lufthansa Regional – Miles & More

Aegean Airlines – Miles+Bonus
Olympic Air – Miles+Bonus

Wizz Air – Wizz Discount Club

Icelandair – Saga Club

Aer Lingus –  AER Club

Air Dolomiti – Miles & More
ITA Airways – Volare

airBaltic – PINS (previously Euro Bonus and BalticMiles)

Luxair – Miles & More

Air Malta – Flypass

Air Moldova – Air Moldova Club

KLM – Flying Blue
KLM Cityhopper – Flying Blue
Transavia – Flying Blue

Nordic Regional Airlines – Finnair Plus
Norwegian Air Shuttle – Norwegian Reward
Scandinavian Airlines – EuroBonus
Widerøe – EuroBonus

LOT Polish Airlines – Miles & More

TAP Air Portugal – TAP Miles&Go (previously Victoria Miles)

TAROM – Flying Blue
Carpatair – Carpatair Frequent Flyer
Blue Air – My Blue Air

Aeroflot – Aeroflot Bonus
S7 Airlines – S7 Priority
Smartavia – Golden Mile
Ural Airlines – Wings
UTair – Status

Air Serbia – Etihad Guest

Air Europa – Suma
Air Nostrum – Avios
Binter Canarias – Bintermás
Iberia – Iberia Plus
Iberia Express – Avios
Vueling – Vueling Club (previously Vueling Punto)

Scandinavian Airlines – EuroBonus
BRA Braathens Regional Airlines – BRA Vänner

Edelweiss Air – Miles & More
Swiss International Air Lines – Miles & More (previously Swiss TravelClub)

Ukraine International Airlines – Panorama Club
Dniproavia Airlines – Bonus Club
UTair-Ukraine – Status

Aurigny – Aurigny Frequent Flyer
BA CityFlyer – Executive Club 
British Airways – Executive Club
EasyJet – Flight Club / easyJet Plus
Jet2 – My Jet2 Travel Club
Loganair – Clan Loganair
Virgin Atlantic – Flying Club

Middle East

Azerbaijan Airlines – AZAL Miles
Buta Airways – AZAL Miles

Gulf Air – Falconflyer

Air Arabia Egypt – AirRewards
EgyptAir – Egyptair Plus

Mahan Air – Mahan & Miles
 IranAir – SkyGift

El Al – Matmid Club
UP – Matmid Club

Royal Jordanian – Royal Club
Royal Wings – Royal Club

Kuwait Airways – Oasis Club

Middle East Airlines – Cedar Miles

Oman Air – Sindbad

Qatar Airways – Privilege Club (Qmiles)

Saudia – Alfursan
Flynas – Nasmiles
SaudiGulf – SaudiGulf Club

Syrianair – SyrianAir Frequent Flyer

AnadoluJet – Miles&Smiles
Pegasus Airlines – Pegasus Plus
SunExpress – SunPoints
Turkish Airlines – Miles&Smiles

Air Arabia – AirRewards
Emirates – Skywards
Etihad Airways – Etihad Guest
flydubai – OPEN

Yemenia – Sama Club

Asia

Ariana Afghan Airlines – Ariana Miles
Kam Air – Go Orange
Safi Airways – Saffron Rewards

Biman Bangladesh Airlines – Biman Loyalty Club
NovoAir – Smiles

Druk Air – My Happiness Reward

Royal Brunei Airlines – Royal skies

Cambodia Angkor Air – AngkorWards

Air China – Phoenix Miles
Beijing Capital Airlines – Fortune Wings Club
China Eastern Airlines – Eastern Miles
China Southern Airlines – Sky Pearl Club
China United Airlines – Eastern Miles
Chongqing Airlines – Sky Pearl Club
Dalian Airlines – Phoenix Miles
Donghai Airlines – Seagull Club
Fuzhou Airlines – Fortune Wings Club
Grand China Air – Fortune Wings Club
GX Airlines – Fortune Wings Club
Hainan Airlines – Fortune Wings Club
Hebei Airlines –  Egret Club
Jiangxi Air – Egret Club
Juneyao Airlines – Juneyao Air Club
Kunming Airlines – Zunxiang Club
Lucky Air – Fortune Wings Club
Okay Airways – Lucky Clouds Club
Qingdao Airlines – Tianhaizhiyun Club
Shandong Airlines – Phoenix Miles
Shanghai Airlines – Eastern Miles
Shenzhen Airlines – Phoenix Miles (previously King Club)
Sichuan Airlines – Golden Panda Club
Spring Airlines – Spring Pass
Suparna Airlines – Fortune Wings Club
Tianjin Airlines – Fortune Wings Club
Tibet Airlines – Phoenix Miles
Urumqi Air – Fortune Wings Club
XiamenAir – Egret Club

Cathay Pacific – Asia Miles / Cathay (Previously Marco Polo Club)
HK Express – Asia Miles (previously Fortune Wings Club and reward-U)
Hong Kong Airlines – Fortune Wings Club

AirAsia India – BIG
Air India – Flying Returns
Alliance Air – Flying Returns
Vistara – Club Vistara
SpiceJet – Spice Club

Batik Air – Batik Frequent Flyer
Citilink – Supergreen GarudaMiles
Garuda Indonesia – GarudaMiles
Indonesia AirAsia – BIG
Lion Air – Lion Passport

Air Japan – ANA Mileage Club
Air Do – My AirDo
All Nippon Airways – ANA Mileage Club
ANA Wings – ANA Mileage Club
Amakusa Airlines – AMX Point Card
J-Air – JAL Mileage Bank
Japan Airlines – JAL Mileage Bank
Japan Transocean Air – JAL Mileage Bank
Jetstar Japan – JAL Mileage Bank / QF Frequent Flyer
Solaseed Air – Solaseed Smile Club
StarFlyer – Starlink Members
Zipair Tokyo – Zipair Point Club

Air Astana – Nomad Club

Air Bishkek – Belek Bonus

Lao Airlines – Champa Muang Lao

Air Macau – Phoenix Miles (previously Privileges)

AirAsia – BIG
AirAsia X – BIG
Firefly – BonusLink/ Enrich
Malaysia Airlines – Enrich
Malindo Air – Malindo Miles
MASWings – Enrich

Aero Mongolia – Sky Miles
Hunnu Air – Hunnu Club
MIAT Mongolian Airlines – Blue Sky Mongolia

Air Bagan – Royal Lotus Plus
Myanmar Airways International – Sky Smiles Club
Myanmar National Airlines – MNA Club
Yangon Airways – Elite Club

Buddha Air – Royal Club
Saurya Airlines – Saurya Saarathi
Shree Airlines – High Flyer Club
Yeti Airlines – SkyClub

Cebu Pacific – Getgo (previously Summit Club)
Cebgo – Getgo
PAL Express – Mabuhay Miles
Philippine Airlines – Mabuhay Miles
Philippines AirAsia – BIG

Pakistan International Airlines – PIA Awards Plus+
Airblue – Blue Miles
Air Indus – Indus Miles

Jetstar Asia Airways – QF Frequent Flyer
Scoot – KrisFlyer
Singapore Airlines – KrisFlyer / PPS Club

Air Busan – Fly & Stamp
Asiana Airlines – Asiana Club
Jeju Air – Refresh Point
Korean Air – SKYPASS

Cinnamon Air – FlySmiLes (previously Serendib Miles)
SriLankan Airlines – FlySmiLes (previously Serendib Miles)

China Airlines – Dynasty Flyer
Mandarin Airlines – Dynasty Flyer
EVA Air – Infinity MileageLands
Starlux Airlines – Cosmile
UNI Air – Infinity MileageLands

Bangkok Airways – FlyerBonus
Thai AirAsia – BIG
Thai AirAsia X – BIG
Thai Airways – Royal Orchid Plus
Thai Smile – Royal Orchid Plus
Thai Vietjet Air – Vietjet Skyclub
Nok Air – Nok Fan Club

Uzbekistan Airways – UzAirPlus

Bamboo Airways – Bamboo Club
VietJet Air – Vietjet Skyclub
Vietnam Airlines – LotuSmiles

Africa

TAAG Angola Airlines – Umbi Umbi Club

Air Algérie – Air Algérie Plus

Ethiopian Airlines – Sheba Miles

Air Côte d'Ivoire – sMiles Program

Kenya Airways – Flying Blue

Afriqiyah Airways – Rahal

Air Madagascar – Namako

Air Mauritius – Kestrel Flyer

Air Arabia Maroc – AirRewards
Royal Air Maroc – Safar Flyer

LAM Mozambique Airlines – Flamingo Club

Air Austral – Capricorne Program

RwandAir – Dream Miles

Air Seychelles – Etihad Guest

Mango Airlines – Voyager
Airlink – Skybucks
South African Airways – Voyager

Precision Air – PAA Royal

ASKY Airlines – ASKY Club

TunisAir – Fidelys

Air Zimbabwe – Rainbow Club

Oceania

JetConnect – QF Frequent Flyer
Jetstar Airways – QF Frequent Flyer
Qantas – QF Frequent Flyer
QantasLink – QF Frequent Flyer
Virgin Australia – Velocity
Virgin Australia Regional Airlines – Velocity

Fiji Airways – Tabua Club

Air Tahiti Nui – Club Tiare

Air Calin – Flying Blue

Air New Zealand – Airpoints
Air New Zealand Link – Airpoints

Air Niugini – Destinations

Solomon Airlines – Belama Club

Air Vanuatu – QF Frequent Flyer

See also 
Airline alliance
Oneworld
SkyTeam
Star Alliance
Value Alliance
U-FLY Alliance
Vanilla Alliance

References

Miles & More – www.miles-and-more.com
Flying Blue – www.flyingblue.com

Business-related lists
Airline-related lists
 
Frequent